Domingo Melín or simply Melín was a Mapuche chief active in the Mapuche resistance to the Occupation of Araucanía (1861–1883). In 1870 Domingo Melín went on behalf of Quilapán to seek a peace agreement with Chile. He was murdered by elements of the Chilean military in 1880.

References

Bibliography 

19th-century Mapuche people
People of the Occupation of Araucanía
Indigenous leaders of the Americas
People from Araucanía Region
1880 deaths
Year of birth missing